Ivan Baglayev (born 15 November 1975) is a Kazakhstani judoka. He competed in the men's half-lightweight event at the 2000 Summer Olympics.

References

1975 births
Living people
Kazakhstani male judoka
Olympic judoka of Kazakhstan
Judoka at the 2000 Summer Olympics
Place of birth missing (living people)
Asian Games medalists in judo
Judoka at the 1998 Asian Games
Asian Games silver medalists for Kazakhstan
Medalists at the 1998 Asian Games
20th-century Kazakhstani people
21st-century Kazakhstani people